Spinoberea is a genus of longhorn beetles of the subfamily Lamiinae, containing the following species:

 Spinoberea cephalotes Gressitt, 1942
 Spinoberea subspinosa Pic, 1922

References

Saperdini